Logia Pou Kaine (English: Words That Burn) is the title of the 6th studio album by Greek singer Giorgos Sabanis. The album released under the label Cobalt Music in Greece and Cyprus on 5 December 2016.
The album went four times platinum, over-passing the number of 50,000 sales, and is the best selling album of Sabanis so far.

Track listing

Singles
"Isos Pio Vathia Kopo"
"Isos Pio Vathia Kopo"  was the first single from the album, released on 17 October 2016. The video clip of the song was released on 19 December 2016.
"Min Anisiheis"
The second single was "Min Anisiheis", released on 30 January 2017 on all Greek radio stations.
"Mono Esi"
"Mono Esi" was the third single, released on 13 June 2017 with a video clip by Yiannis Papadakos.
"Den Xehnao Ki As Ponao Otan Thimame"
 "Den Xehnao Ki As Ponao Otan Thimame" was the fourth single  from the album. The music video clip was released on 6 November 2017.
"Piso"
 The fifth single was the song "Piso", released on 23 March 2018.  This was the last song with a video clip from the album. 
"Logia Pou Kaine"
The title song was the sixth single, released as a digital single on 5 June 2018.

Release history

Charts
The album was number one in the Greek Albums Chart, it was certified on 21 February 2018.

Personnel

Soumka – executive producer, mixing
Anestis Psaradakos –  mastering
Hristos Avdelas –  guitar, bass, drums
Dimitris Tsakoumis – creative director
Foxdesign – artwork
Krida –  background vocals
Dimitris Skoulas – photography
Spiros Savvinos – styling

References

Greek-language albums
2016 albums